EPR Architects is a London-based architectural practice that originally started business under the names of its founders Elsom Pack & Roberts. It is known for commercial, residential and hotel projects.

Cecil Elsom CBE (17 January 1912 – 3 April 2006) founded the practice in London  in 1947 with William Pack and Alan Roberts. According to Elsom's obituary in The Times: "[He was an] Architect who appreciated classical design and restoration but also provided London with admirable postwar buildings." Projects such as the international style Eastbourne Terrace office scheme became the trademark style in the practice's early years.

The practice changed its name to EPR Partnership in the eighties, and then EPR Architects in 1988. EPR Architects has studios in London, Manchester and Wroclaw. The London studio is based in the historic All Saints building, Lambeth, previously being based in Pimlico.  The practice was listed in AJ100 for 2022 at position 11 out of the top 100 architectural practices. The company sponsors the New London Architecture centre and UK Green Building Council's Pinpoint.

National Life Stories conducted an oral history interview (C467/10) with Cecil Elsom in 1997 for its Architects Lives' collection held by the British Library.

Notable projects
American Express, Brighton
 Ram Brewery, Wandsworth, London
 Bernard Weatherill House, Croydon
 2 Waterhouse Square, London
 Greenwich Millennium Village (now Maurer Court), Greenwich, London
 Parliament View, London
 Greenwich Millennium Village, Greenwich, London 
 Twenty Rathbone Place, London
 24 Savile Row, London with potter Kate Malone
 Cardinal Place (offices and shopping centre), London (2006)
 Qube (mixed use), London (2008)
Eastbourne Terrace, Paddington, London (1958) At the time of opening, the 18-storey building was one of the highest in Britain.
Hammersmith Broadway (offices, retail and transport interchange), London
London Weekend Television Centre (now The London Studios), London (1972)
Victoria Street (offices and retail, Ashdown House), London (1975)

References

External links 
Official site

Architecture firms based in London
Design companies established in 1947
1947 establishments in England